Nicolas Barreau is a pseudonymous Franco-German author who works in the publishing world. He studied Romance languages and literature at the Sorbonne and worked in a bookshop on the Rive Gauche in Paris. He has written several bestsellers:

 Le Sourire des femmes
 Tu me trouveras au bout du monde
 La Vie en Rosalie
 Un soir a Paris
 Menu d'amour

References

 

French writers
Living people
Year of birth missing (living people)